Mount Benvolio is a  glacier-clad peak located in the Garibaldi Ranges of the Coast Mountains, in Garibaldi Provincial Park of southwestern British Columbia, Canada. It is the second-highest point of the Fitzsimmons Range, which is a subset of the Garibaldi Ranges. The Benvolio Glacier is set on the western slope of the peak, the Diavolo Glacier spreads out below the eastern aspect of the summit, and the Fitzsimmons Glacier descends the north slope. Precipitation runoff from the peak and meltwater from its glaciers drains into tributaries of the Cheakamus River.

History
The first ascent of the mountain was made in 1923 by Phyllis Munday and Don Munday via the Benvolio Glacier. The peak was named in 1964 by a climbing party from the Alpine Club of Canada to commemorate the 400th anniversary of the birth of William Shakespeare. Viewed from the north, this peak stands out between Overlord Mountain and Mount Fitzsimmons, however its beauty from afar is somewhat dulled close up. Shakespeare's Romeo and Juliet had a character named Benvolio who shared similar traits. The mountain's name was officially adopted on August 27, 1965, by the Geographical Names Board of Canada.

Climate

Based on the Köppen climate classification, Mount Benvolio is located in the marine west coast climate zone of western North America. Most weather fronts originate in the Pacific Ocean, and travel east toward the Coast Mountains where they are forced upward by the range (Orographic lift), causing them to drop their moisture in the form of rain or snowfall. As a result, the Coast Mountains experience high precipitation, especially during the winter months in the form of snowfall. Temperatures can drop below −20 °C with wind chill factors below −30 °C. The months July through September offer the most favorable weather for climbing Mount Benvolio.

See also
 Geography of British Columbia
 Geology of British Columbia

References

External links

 Weather: Mount Benvolio

Garibaldi Ranges
Two-thousanders of British Columbia
Pacific Ranges
Sea-to-Sky Corridor
New Westminster Land District